Robert Loh (born 24 January 1946) is a Hong Kong former butterfly, freestyle and medley swimmer. He competed at the 1964 Summer Olympics and the 1968 Summer Olympics.

References

External links
 

1946 births
Living people
Hong Kong male butterfly swimmers
Hong Kong male freestyle swimmers
Hong Kong male medley swimmers
Commonwealth Games competitors for Hong Kong
Swimmers at the 1962 British Empire and Commonwealth Games
Olympic swimmers of Hong Kong
Swimmers at the 1964 Summer Olympics
Swimmers at the 1968 Summer Olympics
Swimmers from Shanghai
Swimmers at the 1962 Asian Games
Swimmers at the 1966 Asian Games
Asian Games competitors for Hong Kong